Ihľany (Goral: Majōrki) is a village and municipality in Kežmarok District in the Prešov Region of north Slovakia.

History
In historical records the village was first mentioned in 1307.

Geography
The municipality lies at an altitude of 706 metres and covers an area of 9.587 km².
It has a population of about 1380 people.

See also
 List of municipalities and towns in Slovakia

References

Genealogical resources

The records for genealogical research are available at the state archive "Statny Archiv in Levoca,Slovakia"

External links
https://web.archive.org/web/20080111223415/http://www.statistics.sk/mosmis/eng/run.html
http://www.ihlany.sk
Surnames of living people in Ihlany

Villages and municipalities in Kežmarok District